The William Bowie Medal is awarded annually by the American Geophysical Union for "outstanding contributions to fundamental geophysics and for unselfish cooperation in research". The award is the highest honor given by the AGU and is named in honor of William Bowie, one of the co-founders of the Union.

Past recipients
Source: AGU

See also
 List of geophysicists
 List of geophysics awards
 List of prizes named after people

References

Bowie Medal
Bowie Medal
Bowie Medal